Suphachai "Saenchai" Saepong (born July 30, 1980), formerly known as Saenchai Sor. Kingstar, is a Muay Thai fighter of Khon Isan descent. Saenchai won the Lumpinee Stadium title, which is widely considered the most prestigious title in Muay Thai, in four different weight divisions, while mostly fighting larger opponents. He is considered by many to be the best pound for pound Muay Thai fighter, and is regarded as one of the best fighters of all time. Saenchai would often give up weight to find worthy opponents in Thailand, and from 2003-2014 only lost two times in Thailand when the weights were equal, with all other losses happening when he was forced to have a weight disadvantage to make the fights more equal.

Since 2010 he has fought 88 times in 15 countries and is perhaps the most active international fighter. He is known for his excellent head movement, defensive footwork, unconventional kicks, and jumping attacks. His speed, athleticism, and the large variety in his unorthodox arsenal made him an exceptionally difficult opponent to prepare for. He retired from serious competition in Thailand in 2014 and now solely competes in showcase fights around the world against foreign, usually bigger opponents. Upon retiring from competition on the Thai circuit he was still able to make 130 pounds, with his final fight being forced to make 129 pounds.

Since 2014, Saenchai has frequently competed at the Thai Fight promotion, a Thailand-based promotion. He has often been the headliner at more recent Thai Fight events and has won four King's Cup titles with the promotion at 67 kg and 70 kg. He holds the promotion's records for most titles with 4 and all-time wins with 43.

Biography

Early career
Saenchai started learning Muay Thai when he was 8 years old. He decided to start learning Muay Thai in Jocky gym when his friend's elder brother received a prize after a bout. He debuted after training for only a week, and he won his first bout by decision receiving 30 Baht (≒$1).

He started fighting in Bangkok when he was 14 years old, then transferred to Kamsing gym owned by Somluck Kamsing. Kamsing paid 300,000 Baht as a transfer fee. This is the reason Saenchai's ring name was Saenchai Sor.Khamsing (แสนชัย ส.​คำ​สิงห์).

In 1997 at age 16 Saenchai won the title of Lumpinee stadium championship at super flyweight. When he was 18, he won the title of Lumpinee stadium championship at bantamweight.

Turning to boxing
In 2002, Saenchai turned to boxing. He debuted as "Suphachai Saenpong" at featherweight. He fought against Rud 4K Kevkatchewon from Philippines to challenge for the vacant interim title of PABA on November 27, 2003, and he won the title by unanimous decision. In January 2004, he retained his PABA title against Rud.

In 2004, he decided to go back to Muay Thai again.

Discord with Khamsing
Saenchai visited Japan twice to fight and Khamsing agreed at those times, but Khamsing disagreed the third time. Although Khamsing tried to stop Saenchai from going to Japan, he went there with some Muay Thai fighters from another gym. Because of this incident, Khamsing broke off relations with Saenchai, and Saenchai moved to Kingstar gym. At this time, Khamsing received 300,000 Baht from Kingstar gym as a transfer fee.
On July 3, 2006, Saenchai fought against Sang-Soo Lim from Korea in Japan. Saenchai was going to fight against Shinya Ishige but he was replaced two weeks earlier as he had been injured during training. Lim was 21 cm taller and 10 kg heavier than Saenchai but Saenchai knocked out Lim in 2R with a right hook.

On July 3, 2009, Saenchai fought against two Muay Thai fighters in the single bout at Lumpinee stadium. During 1 to 3 round, he fought against Petchboonchu FA Group. Petchboonchu tried to attack aggressively at 1R, but Saenchai carried throughout his stamina-saving style and broke Petchboonchu's balance several times. During 4 to 5 round, Saenchai fought against Sagetdao Petpayathai. Saenchai controlled his critical distance with front-kicks and middle-kicks and he threw telling blows more than Sakeddaow did. The referee announced Saenchai's victory with unanimous decision after 5R.

Winning world title

On March 14, 2010, Saenchai fought against Tetsuya Yamato from Japan to challenge the vacant world lightweight title sanctioned by Muay Thai Association of America (MTAA) in Los Angeles. Saenchai knocked out Yamato with left high kick at 1R, and won the MTAA title.

Career highlights
In 2011, Saenchai was signed by Yokkao founder, Philip Villa as a sponsored fighter of the Yokkao Fight Team. In the same year, Saenchai led the Muay Thai Combat Fan Expo in Rimini, Italy with Buakaw Banchamek, Sudsakorn Sor Klinmee, Dzhabar Askerov and many others.

On January 21, 2012, Saenchai fought at Yokkao Extreme 2012 in front of 12,000 attendees. He lost for the first time against a European in Muay Thai rules. The fight took place in Milan Italy against the foreign Thai boxer, Fabio Pinca. Saenchai had beaten Pinca years earlier. Despite the 12 kg weight difference, Saenchai put up a good fight. However, by the third round the size difference was starting to pay off for Pinca. He used his strength to tie Saenchai up and win a close but controversial decision. A headbutt by Pinca on Saenchai went unpunished as well as Saenchai's streak of 20 or more straight wins against foreign fighters was snapped.

He rematched Singdam Kiatmoo9 on October 4, 2012, at Rajadamnern, and won by decision.

He beat Pakorn Sakyothin by decision at Super Showdown 4 in Glasgow, Scotland on November 10, 2012, and then took a points victory over Damian Alamos twelve days later at Best of Siam 2 in Paris, France. Saenchai then defeated Liam Harrison for the third time at Muay Thai Warriors in Macau on December 9, 2012, taking a clear-cut unanimous decision.

He outpointed the bowl cut Diesellek Aoodonmuang at Yokkao Extreme 2013 on January 26, 2013, in Milan, Italy.

On March 9, 2013, Saenchai outpointed Houcine Bennoui at Siam Warriors in Cork, Ireland.

He lost to 17-year-old phenom Yodwicha Por Boonsit on points at Lumpinee on May 10, 2013. The pair were set to rematch on June 7, 2013, but a lingering neck injury forced Saenchai out of the bout.

He debuted under Oriental kickboxing rules at Hoost Cup: Kings in Nagoya, Japan on June 16, 2013, and beat Yosuke Mizuochi by unanimous decision in a three-round fight.

He beat Rafi Bohic by unanimous decision at Muay Thai Warriors: Dabble in Chiang Mai on June 28, 2013, in Chiang Mai, Thailand.

Saenchai ran through a field of overmatched farangs to win the Toyota Vigo Marathon Tournament on July 24, 2013, in Phitsanulok.

Saenchai beat Kongsak Sitboonmee by decision in a rematch at Rajadamnern on August 8, 2013.

It was reported that he would fight Mickaël Piscitello at the WBC World Muay Thai Millennium Championship in Saint-Pierre, Réunion on September 7, 2013. However, he denied ever being on the card.

He fought Andrei Kulebin at Combat Renaissance in China on September 17, 2013.

He beat Singdam Kiatmuu9 by decision at Yokkao 5 in Pattaya, Thailand on November 15, 2013.

He lost an extension round decision to Kong Hong Xing at the K-1 World MAX 2013 World Championship Tournament Quarter Finals - Part 1 in Foshan, China on December 28, 2013.

2014
He lost to Petchboonchu FA Group on points at the last ever show held at the old Lumpinee Stadium on February 7, 2014.

Saenchai defeated Victor Nagbe by decision in a -65 kg match at Yokkao 7 in Pattaya, Thailand on February 19, 2014.

He was scheduled for a March 8, 2014, meeting with Irishman Stephen Hodgers at Origins IV at Welterweight (-64.00 kg/141 lb) in Perth, Western Australia. Saenchai was unable to compete, however, as he did not meet certain criteria demanded by the Western Australia Combat Sports Commission and was replaced by Komkit Chanawong.

Saenchai beat Nong-O on points in a three-rounder at the grand opening of the new Lumpinee Stadium on February 28, 2014.

Saenchai defeated Shota Sato via unanimous decision at Hoost Cup: Legend in Nagoya, Japan on March 23, 2014.

He beat Kamen Picken via UD at Combat Banchamek in Surin, Thailand on April 14, 2014.

He defeated Bertrand Lambert via decision at Muay Thai in Macau on June 6, 2014.

He will rematch Yetkin Özkul in a fight for the WMC World Lightweight (-61.2 kg/135 lb) Championship at Monte Carlo Fighting Masters 2014 in Monte Carlo, Monaco on June 14, 2014.

On September 24, 2014, Saenchai P.K. Saenchai Muaythaigym made his debut on the Thai Fight stage, defeating the strong Scotsman Craig Dickson (Sumalee) under Kard Chuek rules (with rope bindings taking the place of gloves).

2017
Saenchai defeated Shan Cangelosi of Italy by decision in the main event at THAI FIGHT Turin on May 27, 2017, in Turin, Italy.
Saenchai took a unanimous decision against Spanish Jonathan Fabian at Yokkao 26 on September 11, 2017, in Hong Kong. Saenchai defeated Juan Salmeron by decision on September 30, 2017, at Thai Fight Barcelona.

Saenchai fought and defeated American Arthur Sorsor by decision at KHMER - THAI FIGHT on November 25, 2017 in Phnom Penh, Cambodia.

2018
Saenchai went the entirety of 2018 undefeated in Muay Thai competition. He spent the whole year fighting in the THAI FIGHT circuit, going a perfect 9–0.

On January 27, 2018, he defeated Henrique Muller of Brazil by KO in the 3rd round at THAI FIGHT Bangkok 2017 to win the 2017 THAI FIGHT 67 kg King's Cup title, his second THAI FIGHT championship.

Saenchai then stopped Iran's Ramin Moazzami by 1st-round KO on March 24, 2018 at THAI FIGHT Mueang Khon 2018.

On April 21, 2018, he defeated Italy's Luca Roma THAI FIGHT Italy 2018 by unanimous decision.

On May 12, 2018, he defeated another Italian, Andrea Serra, by unanimous decision at THAI FIGHT Samui 2018.

On July 7, 2018, Saenchai defeated Amir Naseri of Iran at THAI FIGHT Hat Yai 2018.

On August 25, 2018, he defeated Russia's Nikita Surovezhkin by unanimous decision at THAI FIGHT Rayong 2018.

On October 27, 2018, Saenchai took a unanimous decision victory over Isaac Santos of Brazil at THAI FIGHT Chiang Rai 2018.

On November 24, 2018, he defeated Sif El Islam Djebaili by 1st-round KO at THAI FIGHT Saraburi 2018.

To close out the year, Saenchai faced Jamal Madani for the 2018 THAI FIGHT 67 kg title at THAI FIGHT Nakhon Ratchasima 2018 on December 22, 2018. After three rounds, Saenchai was awarded the unanimous decision victory and was crowned the 2018 THAI FIGHT 67 kg King's Cup Champion, claiming his third consecutive promotional title.

2019
Saenchai began the year fighting at Yokkao 36 in Italy on January 26, 2019, where he defeated Cristian Faustino by unanimous decision.

He returned to the THAI FIGHT stage in time for the first event of the year, where he faced Firdavs Boynazarov at THAI FIGHT Phuket 2019. Saenchai went on to defeat Boynazarov by unanimous decision.

On March 8, 2019, Saenchai headed out for the UAE to compete at Fight Night Dubai to battle Valerii Abramenko of Ukraine, whom he defeated by unanimous decision.

Saenchai returned to THAI FIGHT once again on March 30, 2019. At THAI FIGHT Mueang Khon 2019, he knocked out Javad Bigdeli of Iran in the 2nd round after a series of knees to the body.

On June 29, 2019, he defeated Argentina's Cristian Pastore by unanimous decision at THAI FIGHT Betong 2019.

On August 24, 2019, Saenchai defeated Cem Deniz of Australia by unanimous decision at THAI FIGHT Kham Chanod 2019 in Udon Thani.

In September, 2019, Saenchai went on a Muay Thai seminar tour in the US with Spencer Brown, Yodchai and Kru Jack. They visited 20 gyms in 20 different cities over a 3-week period.

On October 26, 2019, Saenchai delivered a 1st-round knockout victory over Batjargal Sundui of Mongolia at THAI FIGHT Bangsaen 2019.

Saenchai was entered into the 2019 THAI FIGHT 70 kg King's Cup Tournament prior to THAI FIGHT Mae Sot 2019. On November 23, 2019, Saenchai defeated Alejandro Amicucci of Argentina via 1st-round KO in the THAI FIGHT 70 kg King's Cup Tournament Semi Finals at THAI FIGHT Mae Sot 2019, advancing to the Tournament Final.

On December 21, 2019, he would face Tophik Abdullaev of Georgia in THAI FIGHT 70 kg King's Cup Tournament Final at the THAI FIGHT finale of 2019: THAI FIGHT: Thai Fest in Patong. The fight would see a quick finish as Saenchai landed a knee in the clinch during the 1st round, claiming the KO victory. As a result, he would be crowned the 2019 THAI FIGHT 70 kg King's Cup Tournament Champion, his second title with THAI FIGHT.

2020
At YOKKAO 45 & 46, Saenchai fought Shan Cangelosi for the YOKKAO Diamond Welterweight title. He won the fight by a unanimous decision.

After an eight month break, as no events were held during the COVID-19 pandemic, Saenchai returned at the Thai Fight: New Normal event against Rodrigo Freitas. He won the fight by decision. At Thai Fight Begins, he fought Esmail Ganji in the event headliner, winning the fight by decision.

Saenchai fought twice in November 2020. At Thai Fight Korat 2020, he fought Danilo Reis, and won by decision. Three weeks later, he scored a second-round knockout of Gabriel dos Santos.

2021
Saenchai's first fight of 2021 came on April 3, at Thai Fight Nan, against Seth Grande. Saenchai won a dominant unanimous decision. Seanchai faced Omar Elouers at THAI FIGHT Khao Aor on December 19, 2021. He won the fight by a first-round knockout.

2022
On August 2, 2022, it was announced that Saenchai had signed a multi-fight contract with Bare Knuckle Fighting Championship and is expected to debut in his native Thailand in late 2022. However, in October 2022 it was announced that Saenchai would face fellow Muay Thai legend Buakaw Banchamek in a bare-knuckle muay thai bout in a BKFC event in March 2023.

Titles and accomplishments
Muay Thai
YOKKAO
2020 YOKKAO Diamond Welterweight Champion
THAI FIGHT 
2019 THAI FIGHT 70 kg King's Cup Champion 
2018 THAI FIGHT 67 kg King's Cup Champion 
2017 THAI FIGHT 67 kg King's Cup Champion
2016 THAI FIGHT Kard Chuek 70 kg King's Cup Champion
Most championships in Thai Fight (4) 
Most wins in Thai Fight (52) 
52–0 record 
Phoenix Fighting Championship
2017 Phoenix Fighting Championship 63.5 kg Champion
Toyota Marathon
2014 Toyota Marathon Runner-up
2013 Toyota Vigo Marathon Tournament
Muay Thai Warriors
2012 Muay Thai Warriors Welterweight (65 kg) champion
World Professional Muaythai Federation (WPMF)
2012 WPMF World Welterweight champion (147 lbs)
WBC Muay Thai
2011 WBC Diamond World Champion
World Muaythai Council (WMC) 
2010 WMC World Lightweight (135 lbs / 61 kg) champion (one defense)
Lumpinee Stadium
2010 Lumpinee Stadium Lightweight (135 lbs/61 kg) champion (one defense)
2006 Lumpinee Stadium Super featherweight (130 lbs/59 kg) champion
2005 Lumpinee Stadium Super featherweight (130 lbs/59 kg) champion (one defense)
1999 2x Lumpinee Stadium Bantamweight (118 lbs/53 kg) champion
1997 Lumpinee Stadium Super flyweight (115 lbs/52 kg) champion
Toyota Cup
2010 Toyota Cup tournament champion
Muay Thai Association of America (MTAA) 
2010 MTAA World Lightweight champion

Boxing
Pan Asian Boxing Association (PABA) 
2003 PABA Featherweight interim champion (Defense: 1)AccomplishmentsSports Writers Association of Thailand 
2008 Sports Writers Association of Thailand Fighter of the Year
1999 Sports Writers Association of Thailand Fighter of the YearSports Authority of Thailand 
2008 Sports Authority of Thailand Fighter of the Year

Muay Thai record

|- style="background:#cfc;"
| 2022-12-24|| Win || align="left" | Elit Honkorng|| Thai Fight: Metropolitan Police Bureau 100th Anniversary || Bangkok, Thailand || KO (High kick) || 2 || 
|- style="background:#CCFFCC;"
| 2022-11-20|| Win || align="left" | Mohammad Khalil|| THAI FIGHT Vana Nava Hua Hin || Hua Hin district, Thailand || Decision || 3 || 3:00
|- style="background:#cfc;"
| 2022-10-16|| Win || align="left" | Nguyen Doan Long || THAI FIGHT Vajiravudh || Bangkok, Thailand || Decision ||3  ||3:00 
|- style="background:#cfc;"
| 2022-06-26|| Win || align="left" | Alan Yauny|| THAI FIGHT Sisaket|| Sisaket province, Thailand || Decision || 3 ||3:00 
|- style="background:#cfc;"
| 2022-05-29|| Win || align="left" | Ali Ghodratisaraskan || THAI FIGHT Nakhon Sawan || Nakhon Sawan province, Thailand || KO (Knee to the body) || 2 ||
|- style="background:#CCFFCC;"
| 2022-05-08|| Win || align="left" | Timothy Kamal || THAI FIGHT Sung Noen || Sung Noen district, Thailand || KO || 1 || 
|- style="background:#cfc;"
| 2022-04-17|| Win || align="left" | Seth Grande|| THAI FIGHT KonlakPathum || , Thailand || Decision || 3 ||3:00 
|- style="background:#cfc;"
| 2022-03-20|| Win || align="left" | Maxim Branis || THAI FIGHT Lampang || Lampang, Thailand || Decision || 3 || 3:00 
|- style="background:#cfc;"
| 2021-12-19|| Win || align="left" | Omar Elouers|| THAI FIGHT Khao Aor || Phatthalung, Thailand || KO (Knee to the Body) || 1 ||
|- style="background:#cfc;"
| 2021-04-03|| Win || align="left" | Seth Grande|| THAI FIGHT Nan || Nan province, Thailand || Decision  || 3 || 3:00
|- style="background:#cfc;" 
| 2020-11-28|| Win || align="left" | Gabriel dos Santos|| THAI FIGHT Pluak Daeng || Rayong, Thailand || TKO  || 2 ||
|- style="background:#cfc;"
| 2020-11-07|| Win || align="left" | Danilo Reis|| THAI FIGHT Korat 2020 || Nakhon Ratchasima, Thailand || Decision  || 3 || 3:00
|- style="background:#cfc;"
| 2020-10-17|| Win || align="left" | Esmail Ganji|| THAI FIGHT Begins || Nonthaburi, Thailand || Decision || 3 || 3:00 
|-
|- style="background:#cfc;"
| 2020-09-19|| Win || align="left" | Rodrigo Freitas|| THAI FIGHT: New Normal|| Bangkok, Thailand || Decision  || 3 || 3:00 
|-
|- style="background:#cfc;"
| 2020-01-25|| Win || align="left" | Shan Cangelosi|| YOKKAO 45 & 46 || Turin, Italy || Decision  || 3 || 3:00 
|-
! style=background:white colspan=9 |
|- style="background:#cfc;"
| 2019-12-21|| Win || align="left" | Tophik Abdullaev|| THAI FIGHT: Thai Fest in Patong || Phuket, Thailand || KO (knee) || 1 || 
|-
! style=background:white colspan=9 |
|-
|- style="background:#cfc;"
| 2019-11-23|| Win || align="left" | Alejandro Amicucci || THAI FIGHT Mae Sot || Mae Sot, Thailand || KO (knees) || 1 ||
|- style="background:#cfc;"
| 2019-10-26|| Win || align="left" | Batjargal Sundui || THAI FIGHT Bangsaen || Chonburi, Thailand || KO (left cross) || 1 ||
|- style="background:#cfc;"
| 2019-08-24|| Win || align="left" | Cem Deniz|| THAI FIGHT Kham Chanod || Udon Thani, Thailand || Decision || 3 || 3:00
|- style="background:#cfc;"
| 2019-06-29|| Win || align="left" | Cristian Pastore|| THAI FIGHT Betong || Betong, Thailand || Decision || 3 || 3:00
|- style="background:#cfc;"
| 2019-04-27|| Win || align="left" | Maksim Manafov || THAI FIGHT Samui 2019 || Ko Samui, Thailand || Decision || 3 || 3:00
|- style="background:#cfc;"
| 2019-03-30|| Win || align="left" | Javad Bidgeli || THAI FIGHT Mueang Khon || Nakhon Si Thammarat, Thailand || KO (knees)  || 2 ||
|- style="background:#cfc;"
| 2019-03-08|| Win || align="left" | Valerii Abramenko || Fight Night Dubai || United Arab Emirates || Decision (Unanimous)  || 3 || 3:00
|- style="background:#cfc;"
| 2019-02-23|| Win || align="left" | Firdavs Boynazarov || THAI FIGHT Phuket || Phuket, Thailand || Decision (Unanimous)  || 3 || 3:00
|- style="background:#cfc;"
| 2019-01-26|| Win || align="left" | Cristian Faustino || YOKKAO 36 || Turin, Italy || Decision (Unanimous)  || 3 || 3:00
|- style="background:#cfc;
| 2018-12-22|| Win || align="left" | Jamal Madani || THAI FIGHT Nakhon Ratchasima || Nakhon Ratchasima, Thailand || Decision (Unanimous) || 3 || 3:00
|-
! style=background:white colspan=9 |
|-
|- style="background:#cfc;"
| 2018-11-24|| Win || align="left" | Sif El Islam Djebaili || THAI FIGHT Saraburi || Saraburi, Thailand || KO (left overhand) || 1 ||
|- style="background:#cfc;"
| 2018-10-27|| Win || align="left" | Isaac Santos || THAI FIGHT Chiangrai 2018 || Chiang Rai, Thailand || Decision (Unanimous) || 3 || 3:00
|- style="background:#cfc;"
| 2018-08-25|| Win || align="left" | Nikita Surovezhkin || THAI FIGHT Rayong || Rayong, Thailand || Decision (Unanimous) || 3 || 3:00
|- style="background:#cfc;"
| 2018-07-07|| Win || align="left" | Amir Naseri || THAI FIGHT Hat Yai || Hat Yai, Thailand || Decision (Unanimous) || 3 || 3:00
|- style="background:#cfc;"
| 2018-05-12|| Win || align="left" | Andrea Serra || THAI FIGHT Samui 2018 || Ko Samui, Thailand || Decision (Unanimous) || 3 || 3:00
|- style="background:#cfc;"
| 2018-04-21|| Win || align="left" | Luca Roma || THAI FIGHT Rome|| Rome, Italy || Decision (Unanimous) || 3 || 3:00
|-  style="background:#cfc;"
| 2018-03-24|| Win || align="left" | Ramin Moazzami || THAI FIGHT Mueang Khon 2018 || Nakhon Si Thammarat, Thailand || KO (left elbow) || 1 ||
|-  style="background:#cfc;"
| 2018-01-27|| Win ||align=left| Henrique Muller || THAI FIGHT Bangkok 2017 || Bangkok, Thailand || KO (left high kick) || 3 ||
|-  style="background:#cfc;"
| 2017-12-23|| Win ||align=left| Abdou Haddad || THAI FIGHT Chiang Mai || Chiang Mai, Thailand || Decision (Unanimous) || 3 || 3:00
|-  style="background:#cfc;"
| 2017-11-25|| Win ||align=left| Arthur Sorsor || KHMER - THAI FIGHT || Phnom Penh, Cambodia || Decision (Unanimous) || 3 || 3:00
|-  style="background:#cfc;"
| 2017-09-30|| Win ||align=left| Juan Salmeron || THAI FIGHT Barcelona || Barcelona, Spain || Decision (Unanimous) || 3 || 3:00
|-  style="background:#cfc;"
| 2017-09-11|| Win ||align=left| Jonathan Fabian || YOKKAO 26 || Hong Kong || Decision || 3 || 3:00
|-  style="background:#cfc;"
| 2017-07-15|| Win ||align=left| Chadd Collins || THAI FIGHT: We Love Yala || Thailand || Decision || 3 || 3:00
|-  style="background:#cfc;"
| 2017-05-27|| Win ||align=left| Shan Cangelosi || THAI FIGHT Italy || Turin, Italy || Decision || 3 || 3:00
|-  style="background:#cfc;"
| 2017-04-29|| Win ||align=left| Azize Hlali || Phoenix Fighting Championship || Lebanon || Decision || 3 || 3:00
|-  style="background:#cfc;"
| 2017-04-08|| Win ||align=left| Abdelnour Ali-Kada || THAI FIGHT Paris || France || Decision || 3 || 3:00
|-  style="background:#cfc;"
| 2016-12-24|| Win ||align=left| Julio Lobo || THAI FIGHT The Fighter King || Thailand || Decision || 3 || 3:00
|-  style="background:#cfc;"
| 2016-11-19|| Win ||align=left| Ncedo Gomba || THAI FIGHT AIR RACE 1 || Thailand || TKO (left cross) || 2 || 
|-  style="background:#cfc;"
| 2016-10-28|| Win ||align=left| Ognjen Topic || YOKKAO 22 || Hong Kong || Decision || 3 || 3:00
|-  style="background:#cfc;"
| 2016-10-15|| Win ||align=left| Jonathan Tuhu || THAI FIGHT Chengdu || Chengdu, China || KO (punch) || 2 || 
|-  style="background:#cfc;"
| 2016-09-11|| Win ||align=left| Charlie Peters || THAI FIGHT London || London, England || Decision || 3 || 3:00
|-  style="background:#cfc;"
| 2016-08-20|| Win ||align=left| Anvar Boynazarov || THAI FIGHT KMITL || Thailand || Decision || 3 || 3:00
|-  style="background:#cfc;"
| 2016-07-23|| Win ||align=left| Iurii Bukhvalov || THAI FIGHT Proud to Be Thai || Thailand || KO (punch) || 1 || 
|-  style="background:#cfc;"
| 2016-06-25|| Win ||align=left| Eddy Nait Slimani || Glory 31: Amsterdam || Amsterdam, Netherlands || Decision (Unanimous) || 3 || 3:00
|-  style="background:#cfc;"
| 2016-04-30|| Win ||align=left| Sean Clancy || THAI FIGHT Samui 2016 || Ko Samui, Thailand || TKO || 3 || 
|-  style="background:#cfc;"
| 2016-03-19|| Win ||align=left| Sergei Soroloev || THAI FIGHT Korat || Thailand || Decision || 3 || 3:00
|-  style="background:#cfc;"
| 2016-02-06|| Win ||align=left| Victor Conesa ||| Enfusion || Thailand || Decision || 3 || 3:00
|- style="background:#cfc;"
| 2016-01-16|| Win ||align=left| Meng Qinghao || Hero Legends || China|| Decision || 3 || 3:00
|-  style="background:#cfc;"
| 2015-12-31|| Win ||align=left| Phal Sophorn || THAI FIGHT Count Down || Bangkok, Thailand || TKO (punch) || 1 || 
|-  style="background:#cfc;"
| 2015-12-05 || Win ||align=left| Vahid Shahbazi || Royal Cup Muay Thai || Kuala Lumpur, Malaysia || Decision || 5 || 3:00
|-  style="background:#cfc;"
| 2015-10-24|| Win ||align=left| Victor Nunes || THAI FIGHT Vietnam || Ho Chi Minh City, Vietnam || Decision || 5 || 3:00
|-  style="background:#cfc;"
| 2015-10-10|| Win ||align=left| Massaro Glunder || Yokkao 15 || England|| Decision || 5 || 3:00
|- style="background:#cfc;"
| 2015-09-17|| Win ||align=left| Takhmasib Kerimov || THAI FIGHT Russia || Moscow, Russia || Decision || 3 || 3:00
|- style="background:#cfc;"
| 2015-08-22|| Win ||align=left| Charles Francois || THAI FIGHT Proud to Be Thai 2015: Narathiwat || Narathiwat, Thailand || KO (left cross)|| 2 || 
|- style="background:#cfc;"
| 2015-08-08|| Win ||align=left| Hamza Essalih || Fight League || Morocco || Decision || 5 || 3:00
|- style="background:#cfc;"
| 2015-07-18|| Win ||align=left| Alessio D´Angelo || THAI FIGHT Proud to Be Thai 2015: China || China || KO (left high kick)|| 1 || 0:30
|- style="background:#cfc;"
| 2015-06-19 || Win ||align=left| Yetkin Ozkul || Best of Siam 6 || Paris, France || TKO (broken nose) || 5 || 
|- style="background:#cfc;"
| 2015-05-10|| Win ||align=left| Yasuyuki || Wanchai Super Fights || Japan|| Decision || 5 || 3:00
|- style="background:#cfc;"
| 2015-05-02|| Win ||align=left| Matt Embree || THAI FIGHT Proud to Be Thai: Samui || Ko Samui, Thailand || Decision ||3 || 3:00
|- style="background:#cfc;"
| 2015-04-04|| Win ||align=left| Jose Neto || THAI FIGHT CRMA || Nakhon Nayok, Thailand || Decision ||3 || 3:00
|- style="background:#cfc;"
| 2014-12-21|| Win || align=left| Gjilas Barache || THAI FIGHT 2014 || Thailand || KO (head kick) || 1 || 
|- style="background:#cfc;"
| 2014-11-22 || Win || align=left| Morgan Adrar || THAI FIGHT Khon Kaen || Khon Kaen, Thailand || Decision || 3 || 3:00
|- style="background:#fbb;"
| 2014-10-09 || Loss || align=left| Phetmorakot Wor.Sangprapai || Rajadamnern Stadium|| Thailand || Decision || 5 || 
|- style="background:#cfc;"
| 2014-09-20 || Win || align=left| Craig Dickson || THAI FIGHT WORLD BATTLE 2014: Vietnam || Vietnam || KO (body punch) || 2 || 
|- style="background:#cfc;"
| 2014-08-16 || Win || align=left| Stephen Meleady || Sandee & Siam Warriors Muay Thai Super Fights || Dublin, Ireland || TKO (cuts) || 4 || 
|- style="background:#cfc;"
| 2014-06-06 || Win || align=left| Bertrand Lambert || Muay Thai in Macau || Macau || Decision || 5 || 3:00
|- style="background:#fbb;"
| 2014-05-30 || Loss || align=left| Singdam Kiatmuu9 || Toyota Marathon Final || Surat Thani, Thailand|| Decision || 3 || 3:00
|- style="background:#cfc;"
| 2014-05-30 || Win || align=left| Jose Neto || Toyota Marathon Semi Final || Surat Thani, Thailand|| Decision || 3 || 3:00
|- style="background:#cfc;"
| 2014-05-30 || Win || align=left| Victor Jimenez || Toyota Marathon Quarter Final || Surat Thani, Thailand|| Decision || 3 || 3:00
|- style="background:#cfc;"
| 2014-04-14 || Win || align=left| Kamen Picken || Combat Banchamek || Surin, Thailand || Decision (unanimous) || 3 || 3:00
|- style="background:#cfc;"
| 2014-03-23 || Win ||align=left| Shota Sato || Hoost Cup: Legend || Nagoya, Japan || Decision (unanimous) || 3 || 3:00
|- style="background:#cfc;"
| 2014-02-28 || Win ||align=left| Nong-O Gaiyanghadao || Grand Opening of New Lumpinee Stadium || Bangkok, Thailand || Decision || 5 || 3:00
|- style="background:#cfc;"
| 2014-02-19 || Win ||align=left| Victor Nagbe || Yokkao 7 || Pattaya, Thailand || Decision || 3 || 3:00
|- style="background:#fbb;"
| 2014-02-07 || Loss ||align=left| Petchboonchu F.A.Group || Lumpinee Stadium || Bangkok, Thailand || Decision || 5 || 3:00
|- style="background:#cfc;"
| 2014-01-17 || Win ||align=left| Adayton Freitas || Muay Thai Warriors || Phuket, Thailand || TKO (punches) || 3 || 
|- style="background:#fbb;"
| 2013-12-28 || Loss ||align=left| Kong Hongxing || K-1 World MAX 2013 World Championship || Foshan, China ||Ext. R Decision (split)|| 4 || 
|- style="background:#fbb;"
| 2013-12-03 || Loss ||align=left| Petchboonchu F.A.Group || Lumpinee Stadium || Bangkok, Thailand || Decision || 5 || 3:00
|- style="background:#cfc;"
| 2013-11-15 ||Win ||align=left| Singdam Kiatmuu9 || Yokkao 5 || Pattaya, Thailand || Decision || 5 || 3:00
|- style="background:#cfc;"
| 2013-10-31 || Win ||align=left| Victor Nagbe || Toyota Marathon || Thailand || Decision || 3 || 3:00
|- style="background:#cfc;"
| 2013-10-11 || Win ||align=left| Kongsak Sitboonmee || Lumpinee Stadium || Bangkok, Thailand || Decision || 5 || 3:00
|-  style="background:#cfc;"
| 2013-09-17 || Win ||align=left| Andrei Kulebin || Combat Renaissance || China|| Decision || 3 || 3:00
|- style="background:#cfc;"
| 2013-09-04 || Win ||align=left| Kongsak Sitboonmee || Rajadamnern Stadium || Bangkok, Thailand || Decision || 5 || 3:00
|- style="background:#cfc;"
| 2013-08-08 || Win ||align=left| Kongsak Sitboonmee || Rajadamnern Stadium || Bangkok, Thailand || Decision || 5 || 3:00
|- style="background:#cfc;"
| 2013-07-24 || Win ||align=left| Naimjon Tuhtaboyev || Toyota Vigo Marathon Tournament, Final || Phitsanulok, Thailand || Decision (unanimous) || 3 || 3:00
|- style="background:#cfc;"
! style=background:white colspan=9 |
|- style="background:#cfc;"
| 2013-07-24 || Win ||align=left| Vahid Shahbazi || Toyota Vigo Marathon Tournament, Semi Finals || Phitsanulok, Thailand || Decision (unanimous) || 3 || 3:00
|- style="background:#cfc;"
| 2013-07-24 || Win ||align=left| Stanislav Patrakov || Toyota Vigo Marathon Tournament, Quarter Finals || Phitsanulok, Thailand || KO (elbow) || 1 || 1:48
|- style="background:#cfc;"
| 2013-06-28 || Win ||align=left| Rafi Singpatong || Muay Thai Warriors: Dabble in Chiang Mai || Chiang Mai, Thailand || Decision (unanimous) || 5 || 3:00
|- style="background:#cfc;"
| 2013-06-16 || Win ||align=left| Yosuke Mizuochi || Hoost Cup Kings || Nagoya, Aichi, Japan|| Decision (unanimous) || 3 || 3:00
|- style="background:#fbb;"
| 2013-05-10 || Loss ||align=left| Yodwicha Por.Boonsit || Lumpinee Stadium || Bangkok, Thailand || Decision (split) || 5 || 3:00
|- style="background:#cfc;"
| 2013-03-09 || Win ||align=left| Houcine Bennoui || Siam Warriors || Cork, Ireland || Decision || 5 || 3:00
|- style="background:#cfc;"
| 2013-01-26 || Win ||align=left| Diesellek Aoodonmuang || Yokkao Extreme 2013 || Milan, Italy || Decision (unanimous) || 5 || 3:00
|- style="background:#fbb;"
| 2013-01-04 || Loss ||align=left| Singdam Kiatmuu9 || Lumpinee Stadium || Bangkok, Thailand || Decision || 5 || 3:00
|- style="background:#cfc;"
| 2012-12-09 || Win ||align=left| Liam Harrison || Muay Thai Warriors || Macau, China|| Decision (unanimous) || 5 || 3:00
|-
! style=background:white colspan=9 |
|- style="background:#cfc;"
| 2012-11-22 || Win ||align=left| Damien Alamos || Best of Siam 2 || Paris, France || Decision || 5 || 3:00
|- style="background:#cfc;"
| 2012-11-10 || Win ||align=left| Pakorn Sakyothin || Super Showdown 4 || Glasgow, Scotland|| Decision || 5 || 3:00
|- style="background:#cfc;"
| 2012-10-04 || Win ||align=left| Singdam Kiatmuu9 || Rajadamnern Stadium || Bangkok, Thailand || Decision || 5|| 3:00
|- style="background:#fbb;"
| 2012-09-07 || Loss ||align=left| Singdam Kiatmuu9 || Lumpinee Stadium || Bangkok, Thailand || Decision || 5 || 3:00
|-
! style=background:white colspan=9 |
|- style="background:#cfc;"
| 2012-08-19 ||Win ||align=left| JChao Li Dao || Muay Thai Warriors || China||KO (elbow) || 1 || 
|-
! style=background:white colspan=9 |
|- style="background:#cfc;"
| 2012-07-20 ||Win ||align=left| Umar Semata || Muaythai Gala – TV 11 || Ratchaburi Province, Thailand || Decision || 5 || 3:00
|-
! style=background:white colspan=9 |
|- style="background:#cfc;"
| 2012-06-14 || Win ||align=left| Mehdi Zatout || Best of Siam || Paris, France || Decision || 5 || 3:00
|- style="background:#cfc;"
| 2012-06-08 || Win ||align=left| PenEk Sitnumnoi || Lumpinee Champion Krikkrai Fight || Bangkok, Thailand || Decision || 5 || 3:00
|- style="background:#cfc;"
| 2012-03-09 || Win ||align=left| Sagetdao Petpayathai || Lumpinee Stadium || Bangkok, Thailand || Decision || 5 || 3:00
|- style="background:#fbb;"
| 2012-01-21 || Loss ||align=left| Fabio Pinca || Yokkao Extreme || Milan, Italy || Decision || 3 || 3:00
|- style="background:#fbb;"
| 2011-12-09 || Loss ||align=left| Sagetdao Petpayathai || Kriekkrai Fights, Lumpinee Stadium || Bangkok, Thailand || Decision || 5 || 3:00
|- style="background:#cfc;"
| 2011-11-13 || Win ||align=left| Shunsuke Ōishi || M-1 Fairtex Muay Thai Challenge Raorak Mauy Final || Tokyo, Japan || KO (left knee shot) || 4 || 1:35
|- style="background:#cfc;"
| 2011-09-13 || Win ||align=left| Petchboonchu F.A.Group || Suek Petchpiya fights, Lumpinee Stadium || Bangkok, Thailand || Decision || 5 || 3:00
|-  style="background:#cfc;"
| 2011-08-14 || Win ||align=left| Kevin Ross || World Class Fights, Commerce Casino || Los Angeles, United States || Decision || 5 || 3:00
|-
! style=background:white colspan=9 |
|-  style="background:#cfc;"
| 2011-07-07 || Win ||align=left| Kongsak Sitboonmee || Wanmitchai Fights, Rajadamnern Stadium || Thailand || Decision || 5 || 3:00
|-  style="background:#cfc;"
| 2011-06-25 || Win ||align=left| Kurt Finlayson || Detonation 9 || Caloundra, Australia|| Decision (Unanimous) || 5 || 3:00
|-
! style=background:white colspan=9 |
|-  style="background:#fbb;"
| 2011-06-10 || Loss ||align=left| Sagetdao Petpayathai || Kriekkrai Fights, Lumpinee Stadium || Bangkok, Thailand || Decision || 5 || 3:00

|- style="background:#cfc;"
| 2011-04-09 || Win ||align=left| Liam Harrison || Fight Sport Industries || Doncaster, England, UK || Decision || 5 || 3:00
|-style="background:#cfc;"
| 2010-12-29 || Win ||align=left| Nong-O SitOr || Wanmitrchai Fights, Rajadamnern Stadium || Bangkok, Thailand || Decision || 5 || 3:00
|-
! style=background:white colspan=9 |
|-style="background:#cfc;"
| 2010-10-05 || Win ||align=left| Petchboonchu F.A.Group || Petyindee fights, Lumpinee Stadium || Bangkok, Thailand || Decision || 5 || 3:00
|-
! style=background:white colspan=9 |
|- style="background:#cfc;"
| 2010-08-13 || Win ||align=left| Superbon Banchamek || Hatyai Stadium || Hatyai, South Thailand || Decision || 5 || 3:00
|- style="background:#cfc;"
| 2010-07-13 || Win ||align=left| Sagetdao Petpayathai || Ruamnamjai Wongkarnmuay Fights, Lumpinee Stadium || Bangkok, Thailand || Decision || 5 || 3:00
|- style="background:#cfc;"
| 2010-07-02 || Win ||align=left| Masoud Izadi || Toyota Cup 2010 Tournament, final || Nakhon Pathom, Thailand || KO (left cross) || 1 || 1:56
|-
! style=background:white colspan=9 |
|- style="background:#cfc;"
| 2010-07-02 || Win ||align=left| Issei Ingram Gym || Toyota Cup 2010 Tournament, semi final || Nakhon Pathom, Thailand || TKO (referee stoppage) || 1 || 2:25
|- style="background:#cfc;"
| 2010-07-02 || Win ||align=left| Imran Khan || Toyota Cup 2010 Tournament, quarter final || Nakhon Pathom, Thailand || TKO (referee stoppage) || 2 || 1:46
|- style="background:#fbb;"
| 2010-06-19 || Loss ||align=left| Wang Weihao || Wu Lin Feng || Henan, China || Decision || 3 || 3:00
|- style="background:#fbb;"
| 2010-06-04 || Loss ||align=left| Phetmankong Petchfergus || TV3 Omnoi Siamboxing Stadium || Bangkok, Thailand || Decision || 5 || 3:00
|- style="background:#cfc;"
| 2010-05-05 || Win ||align=left| Nong-O SitOr || Wanmitchai Grand Opening Fights, Rajadamnern Stadium || Bangkok, Thailand || KO (left cross) || 3 || 1:27
|- style="background:#cfc;"
| 2010-04-03 || Win ||align=left| Yetkin Ozkul || S-8 Thaiboxing || Wuppertal, Germany || KO (left cross) || 2 || 1:48
|- style="background:#cfc;"
| 2010-03-14 || Win ||align=left| Tetsuya Yamato || World Champion Muay Thai Extravaganza || El Monte, California, United States|| KO (left high kick) || 1 || 2:23
|-
! style=background:white colspan=9 |
|- style="background:#fbb;"
| 2009-12-08 || Loss ||align=left| Sagetdao Petpayathai || Kriekkrai Fights, Lumpinee Stadium || Bangkok, Thailand || Decision || 5 || 3:00
|-
! style=background:white colspan=9 |
|- style="background:#cfc;"
| 2009-11-07 || Win ||align=left| Rob Storey || MSA Muaythai Premier League || London, England || TKO (leg kicks) || 4 || 0:13
|- style="background:#cfc;"
| 2009-09-29 || Win ||align=left| Nong-O SitOr || Wanwerapon+JorPorRor7 Fight, Lumpinee Stadium　|| Bangkok, Thailand || Decision || 5 || 3:00
|- style="background:#fbb;"
| 2009-08-07 || Loss ||align=left| Petchboonchu F.A.Group || Petchpiya Fight, Lumpinee Stadium || Bangkok, Thailand || Decision || 5 || 3:00
|-
! style=background:white colspan=9 |
|- style="background:#cfc;"
| 2009-07-03 || Win ||align=left| Sagetdao Petpayathai || Lumpinee vs. Rajadamnern, Lumpinee Stadium, second opponent　|| Bangkok, Thailand || Decision || 2 || 3:00
|- style="background:#cfc;"
| 2009-07-03 || Win ||align=left| Petchboonchu F.A.Group || Lumpinee vs Rajadamnern, Lumpinee Stadium, first opponent || Bangkok, Thailand || Decision || 3 || 3:00
|- style="background:#cfc;"
| 2009-04-03 || Win ||align=left| Petchboonchu F.A.Group || Lumpinee Stadium || Bangkok, Thailand || Decision || 5 || 3:00
|- style="background:#cfc;"
| 2009-02-07 || Win ||align=left| Liam Harrison || Muay Thai Legends || Croydon, England|| Decision (Unanimous) || 5 || 3:00
|- style="background:#cfc;"
| 2009-01-06 || Win ||align=left| Nong-O SitOr || Lumpini Stadium || Bangkok, Thailand || KO (left cross) || 3 ||

|- style="background:#cfc;"
| 2008-12-23|| Win||align=left| Ho Sae-eun || KING OF KINGS TOUITSU in KOBE || Kobe, Japan || KO (Left knee to the body) || 3 || 2:56

|- style="background:#cfc;"
| 2008-11-30 || Win||align=left| Nico Veressen || SLAMM "Nederland vs Thailand V" || Almere, Netherlands || Decision (Unanimous) || 5 || 3:00
|- style="background:#cfc;"
| 2008-10-31 || Win ||align=left| Saenchainoi Toyotarayong || Lumpinee champion Krikkri Fights || Bangkok, Thailand || Decision || 5 || 3:00
|- style="background:#cfc;"
| 2008-10-05|| Win||align=left| Yukihiro Komiya || Muay Thai Open 5 || Tokyo, Japan || Decision (Unanimous) || 5 ||3:00 
|- style="background:#cfc;"
| 2008-09-04 || Win ||align=left| Saenchainoi Toyotarayong || Daorungprabat Fights, Rajadamnern Stadium || Bangkok, Thailand || Decision || 5 || 3:00
|- style="background:#cfc;"
| 2008-08-08 || Win ||align=left| Wuttidet Lukprabat || Lumpini Kriekrai Fights, Lumpinee Stadium || Bangkok, Thailand || Decision || 5 || 3:00
|- style="background:#fbb;"
| 2008-07-04 || Loss ||align=left| Wuttidet Lukprabat || Lumpini Kriekrai Fights, Lumpinee Stadium || Bangkok, Thailand || Decision || 5 || 3:00
|- style="background:#cfc;"
| 2008-05-02 || Win ||align=left| Orono Wor.Petchpun || Suklumpini Kriekrai Fights, Lumpinee Stadium || Bangkok, Thailand || Decision || 5 || 3:00
|-
! style=background:white colspan=9 |
|- style="background:#cfc;"
| 2008-03-02 || Win ||align=left| Rachid Belani || SLAMM "Nederland vs Thailand IV" || Almere, Netherlands || Decision (Unanimous) || 5 || 3:00
|- style="background:#fbb;"
| 2008-02-05 || Loss ||align=left| Petchmankong Petchfergus || Lumpini Stadium || Bangkok, Thailand || Decision || 5 || 3:00
|- style="background:#fbb;"
| 2007-12-07 || Loss ||align=left| Orono Wor.Petchpun || Lumpinee Stadium || Bangkok, Thailand || Decision (Unanimous) || 5 || 3:00
|-
! style=background:white colspan=9 |
|- style="background:#cfc;"
| 2007-10-11 || Win ||align=left| Jomthong Chuwattana || Lumpinee Stadium || Bangkok, Thailand || Decision || 5 || 3:00
|- style="background:#cfc;"
| 2007-07-01 || Win ||align=left| Shinya Ishige || NJKF "Fighting Evolution VIII -Counter The Asian Attack!!-" || Bunkyo, Tokyo, Japan|| Decision(unanimous) || 5 || 3:00
|- style="background:#cfc;"
| 2007-04-21 || Win ||align=left| Fabio Pinca || Gala de Levallois-Perret || Levallois, France|| Decision (Unanimous) || 5 || 3:00
|- style="background:#cfc;"
| 2007-03-15 || Win ||align=left| Jaroenchai Kesagym || Rajadamnern Stadium || Bangkok, Thailand || KO (body kick) || 3 || 
|- style="background:#cfc;"
| 2007-01-28 || Win ||align=left| Kenji Takemura || NJKF "Fighting Evolution II – Muay Thai Open-" || Kōtō, Tokyo, Japan|| KO (left elbow) || 4 || 1:52
|- style="background:#fbb;"
| 2006-11-17 || Loss ||align=left| Nopparat Keatkhamtorn|| Kaiyanghadao tournament, quarter final || Nakhon Ratchasima, Thailand|| Decision || 3 || 3:00
|- style="background:#cfc;"
| 2006-09-22 || Win ||align=left| Duangsompong Kor.Sapaotong || Lumpini Stadium || Bangkok, Thailand || Decision || 5 || 3:00
|-
! style=background:white colspan=9 |
|- style="background:#cfc;"
| 2006-08-18 || Win ||align=left| Nong-O SitOr || Lumpini Stadium || Bangkok, Thailand || Decision || 5 || 3:00
|- style="background:#c5d2ea;"
| 2006-07-21 || Draw ||align=left| Duangsompong Kor.Sapaotong || Lumpini Stadium || Bangkok, Thailand || Decision || 5 || 3:00
|- style="background:#cfc;"
| 2006-07-02 || Win ||align=left| Sang-Soo Lim || NJKF "Advance VI" || Kōtō, Tokyo, Japan|| KO (right hook) || 2 || 1:42
|- style="background:#fbb;"
| 2006-06-02 || Loss ||align=left| Nopparat Keatkhamtorn|| Lumpinee Champion Krirkkrai, Lumpinee Stadium || Bangkok, Thailand || Decision || 5 || 3:00
|-
! style=background:white colspan=9 |
|- style="background:#c5d2ea;"
| 2006-04-25 || Draw ||align=left| Nopparat Keatkhamtorn|| Petchpiya, Lumpinee Stadium || Bangkok, Thailand || Decision || 5 || 3:00
|- style="background:#cfc;"
| 2006-03-24 || Win ||align=left| Singdam Kiatmuu9 || Lumpini Stadium || Bangkok, Thailand || Decision || 5 || 3:00
|- style="background:#cfc;"
| 2006-03-19 || Win ||align=left| Joad Erraji || SLAMM "Nederland vs Thailand" || Almere, Netherlands || KO || 1 ||
|- style="background:#cfc;"
| 2006-02-22 || Win ||align=left| Nopparat Keatkhamtorn|| Meenayothin, Rajadamnern Stadium || Bangkok, Thailand || Decision || 5 || 3:00
|- style="background:#c5d2ea;"
| 2006-01-17 || Draw ||align=left| Nopparat Keatkhamtorn|| Petchyindee, Lumpinee Stadium || Bangkok, Thailand || Decision || 5 || 3:00
|-
! style=background:white colspan=9 |
|- style="background:#cfc;"
| 2005-12-09 || Win ||align=left| Singdam Kiatmuu9 || Lumpini Stadium || Bangkok, Thailand || Decision || 5 || 3:00
|-
! style=background:white colspan=9 |
|- style="background:#cfc;"
| 2005-11-04 || Win ||align=left| Orono Wor.Petchpun || Fairtex Promotions, Lumpinee Stadium || Bangkok, Thailand || Decision (Unanimous) || 5 || 3:00
|- style="background:#fbb;"
| 2005-09-27 || Loss ||align=left| Nopparat Keatkhamtorn|| Wanboonya Fights, Lumpinee Stadium || Bangkok, Thailand || Decision || 5 || 3:00
|- style="background:#cfc;"
| 2005-09-06 || Win ||align=left| Kongpipop Petchyindee || Lumpini Stadium || Bangkok, Thailand || Decision || 5 || 3:00
|- style="background:#cfc;"
| 2005-07-19 || Win ||align=left| Singdam Kiatmuu9 || Lumpini Stadium || Bangkok, Thailand || Decision || 5 || 3:00
|- style="background:#fbb;"
| 2005-06-10 || Loss ||align=left| Singdam Kiatmuu9 || Phetpiya+Jawpawraw7 Fights, Lumpinee Stadium || Bangkok, Thailand || Decision || 5 || 3:00
|- style="background:#cfc;"
| 2005-02-12 || Win ||align=left| Khem Sor.Ploenjit || One Songchai Tsunami Show, Rajamangala Stadium || Bangkok, Thailand || KO (Throw) || 4 || 0:34
|- style="background:#cfc;"
| 2004-12-29 || Win ||align=left| Yodbuangam Lukbanyai || OneSongchai Fights, Rajadamnern Stadium || Bangkok, Thailand || TKO || 3 ||
|- style="background:#fbb;"
| 2004-10-25 || Loss ||align=left| Khem Sor.Ploenjit || Palokmuaythai ITV, Siam Omnoi Stadium || Bangkok, Thailand || Decision (Unanimous) || 5 || 3:00
|- style="background:#cfc;"
| 2004-09-27 || Win ||align=left| Bovy Sor.Udomson || OneSongchai Fights, Rajadamnern Stadium || Bangkok, Thailand || TKO || 4 || 
|- style="background:#cfc;"
| 2004-06-07 || Win ||align=left| Khem Sor.Ploenjit || OneSongchai Fights, Rajadamnern Stadium || Bangkok, Thailand || Decision || 5 || 3:00
|- style="background:#cfc;"
| 2004-05-05 || Win ||align=left| Puja Sor.Suwanee || Jaobunlunglok Fights, Rajadamnern Stadium || Bangkok, Thailand || Decision || 5 || 3:00
|- style="background:#cfc;"
| 2003-08-28 || Win ||align=left| Ronachai Naratrikun || OneSongchai, Lumpinee Stadium || Bangkok, Thailand || Decision || 5 || 3:00
|- style="background:#cfc;"
| 2003-06-23 || Win ||align=left| Sayannoi Kiatprapat || OneSongchai + Petchthongdam Promotion, Rajadamnern Stadium || Bangkok, Thailand || Decision || 5 || 3:00
|- style="background:#cfc;"
| 2003-04-26 || Win ||align=left| Phet-Ek Sitjaopho|| Chachoengsao Promotion || Thailand || Decision || 5 || 3:00
|- style="background:#cfc;"
| 2003-03-03 || Win ||align=left| Nongbee Kiatyongyut || OneSongchai Promotion, Rajadamnern Stadium || Bangkok, Thailand || Decision || 5 || 3:00
|- style="background:#cfc;"
| 2002-10-09 || Win ||align=left| Khunpinit Kiattawan || OneSongchai, Rajadamnern Stadium || Bangkok, Thailand || Decision || 5 || 3:00

|- style="background:#cfc;"
| 2002-08-07 || Win ||align=left| Attachai Nor.Sripueng || Lumpinee Stadium || Bangkok, Thailand || Decision || 5 || 3:00

|- style="background:#cfc;"
| 2002-07-09 || Win ||align=left| Phet-Ek Sitjaopho|| Petchburapa Promotion, Lumpinee Stadium || Bangkok, Thailand || Decision || 5 || 3:00
|- style="background:#c5d2ea;"
| 2002 || Draw ||align=left| Attachai Nor.Sripueng || Lumpinee Stadium || Bangkok, Thailand || Decision || 5 || 3:00

|- style="background:#cfc;"
| 2001-12-19 || Win ||align=left| Nongbee Kiatyongyut || Rajadamnern Stadium - Rajadamnern Anniversary || Bangkok, Thailand || Decision || 5 || 3:00
|- style="background:#cfc;"
| 2001-11-21 || Win ||align=left| Nongbee Kiatyongyut || Rajadamnern Stadium || Bangkok, Thailand || Decision || 5 || 3:00
|- style="background:#cfc;"
| 2001-04-05 || Win||align=left| Attachai Por.Samranchai|| Rajadamnern Stadium || Bangkok, Thailand || Decision || 5 || 3:00
|- style="background:#fbb;"
| 2000-12-02 || Loss ||align=left| Namsaknoi Yudthagarngamtorn || Lumpinee Stadium || Bangkok, Thailand || Decision || 5 || 3:00
|- style="background:#c5d2ea;"
| 2000-00-00 || Draw ||align=left| Attachai Por.Samranchai|| Lumpinee Stadium || Bangkok, Thailand || Decision || 5 || 3:00
|-
|- style="background:#cfc;"
| 2000-10-31 || Win ||align=left| Thongthai Por.Burapha || Lumpinee Stadium || Bangkok, Thailand || Decision || 5 || 3:00
|- style="background:#fbb;"
| 2000-09-08 || Loss ||align=left| Samkor Chor.Rathchatasupak || Lumpinee Stadium || Bangkok, Thailand || Decision || 5 || 3:00
|-
|- style="background:#cfc;"
| 2000-00-00 || Win ||align=left| Samkor Chor.Rathchatasupak || Lumpinee Stadium || Bangkok, Thailand || Decision || 5 || 3:00
|-
|- style="background:#cfc;"
| 2000-07-18 || Win ||align=left| Rambojiew Dongolfservice || OneSongchai, Lumpinee Stadium || Bangkok, Thailand || Decision || 5 || 3:00
|-
|- style="background:#c5d2ea;"
| 2000-06-02 || Draw ||align=left| Rambojiew Dongolfservice || Lumpinee Stadium || Bangkok, Thailand || Decision || 5 || 3:00
|-
|- style="background:#cfc;"
| 2000-04-04 || Win ||align=left| Attachai Por.Samranchai || Lumpinee Stadium || Bangkok, Thailand || Decision || 5 || 3:00
|-
|- style="background:#cfc;"
| 2000-03-03 || Win ||align=left| Attachai Por.Samranchai || OneSongchai, Lumpinee Stadium || Bangkok, Thailand || Decision || 5 || 3:00
|- style="background:#cfc;"
| 2000-02-11 || Win ||align=left| Nongbee Kiatyongyut || OneSongchai, Lumpinee Stadium || Bangkok, Thailand || Decision || 5 || 3:00
|-
|- style="background:#cfc;"
| 1999-12-24 || Win ||align=left| Pornpitak PhetUdomchai || Lumpinee Stadium || Bangkok, Thailand || Decision || 5 || 3:00
|- style="background:#cfc;"
| 1999-00-00 || Win ||align=left| Kochasarn Singklongsi || Lumpinee Stadium || Bangkok, Thailand || Decision || 5 || 3:00
|-
|- style="background:#cfc;"
| 1999-00-00 || Win ||align=left| Khunpinit Kiattawan || Lumpinee Stadium || Bangkok, Thailand || Decision || 5 || 3:00
|- style="background:#cfc;"
| 1999-00-00 || Win ||align=left| Kochasarn Singklongsi || Lumpinee Stadium || Bangkok, Thailand || Decision || 5 || 3:00
|-
|- style="background:#cfc;"
| 1999-08-17 || Win ||align=left| Chalamkhao Kiatpanthong || Lumpinee Stadium || Bangkok, Thailand || Decision || 5 || 3:00
|-
|- style="background:#cfc;"
| 1999-00-00 || Win ||align=left| Khunpinit Kiattawan || Lumpinee Stadium || Bangkok, Thailand || Decision || 5 || 3:00
|-
|- style="background:#cfc;"
| 1999-00-00 || Win ||align=left| Michael Sor.Sakulpan || Lumpinee Stadium || Bangkok, Thailand || Decision || 5 || 3:00
|-
|- style="background:#cfc;"
| 1999-00-00 || Win ||align=left| Nungubon Sitlerchai|| Lumpinee Stadium || Bangkok, Thailand || Decision || 5 || 3:00
|-
! style=background:white colspan=9 |
|- style="background:#fbb;"
| 1999-03-05 || Loss ||align=left| Nungubon Sitlerchai|| Lumpinee Stadium || Bangkok, Thailand || Decision (Split) || 5 || 3:00
|-
! style=background:white colspan=9 |
|-
|- style="background:#cfc;"
| 1999-02-05 || Win ||align=left| Pornpitak PhetUdomchai || Lumpinee Stadium || Bangkok, Thailand || Decision || 5 || 3:00
|-
! style=background:white colspan=9 |

|- style="background:#cfc;"
| 1999-01-12 || Win ||align=left| Thongchai Tor.Silachai || Lumpinee Stadium || Bangkok, Thailand || Decision || 5 || 3:00
|-

|- style="background:#cfc;"
| 1998-12-15 || Win ||align=left| Chaichana Dejtawee|| Lumpinee Stadium || Bangkok, Thailand || KO (Punch)||1 ||

|- style="background:#cfc;"
| 1998-10-26 || Win ||align=left| Sod Luknongyangtoy|| Rajadamnern Stadium || Bangkok, Thailand || KO ||1 ||

|- style="background:#fbb;"
| 1998-09-12 || Loss ||align=left| Thongchai Tor.Silachai || Lumpinee Stadium || Bangkok, Thailand || Decision || 5 || 3:00
|-

|- style="background:#cfc;"
| 1998-07-13 || Win||align=left| Srisatchanalai Sasiprapagym || Lumpinee Stadium || Bangkok, Thailand || Decision || 5 || 3:00

|- style="background:#cfc;"
| 1997- || Win ||align=left| Hurricane Sor.Ploenchit|| Lumpinee Stadium || Bangkok, Thailand || Decision || 5 || 3:00

|-  style="background:#cfc;"
| 1997-09-05 || Win||align=left| Ekachai Chaibadan|| Lumpinee Stadium || Bangkok, Thailand || Decision || 5 || 3:00

|- style="background:#cfc;"
| 1997-07-21|| Win ||align=left| Nuengsiam Fairtex || Lumpinee Stadium || Bangkok, Thailand || Decision || 5||3:00
|-
! style=background:white colspan=9 |

|- style="background:#cfc;"
| 1997-07-02 || Win||align=left| Apidej Naratrikun || Rajadamnern Stadium || Bangkok, Thailand ||Decision || 5 || 3:00

|- style="background:#cfc;"
| 1997-06-06 || Win ||align=left| Hippo 2000Design|| Lumpinee Stadium || Bangkok, Thailand || Decision || 5 || 3:00

|- style="background:#cfc;"
| 1997-05-15 || Win ||align=left| Pali Sor.Ploenchit || Rajadamnern Stadium || Bangkok, Thailand ||Decision || 5 || 3:00

|-  style="background:#fbb;"
| 1997- || Loss||align=left| Ekachai Chaibadan || Lumpinee Stadium || Bangkok, Thailand || Decision || 5 || 3:00
|-
! style=background:white colspan=9 |

|-  style="background:#cfc;"
| 1997- || Win ||align=left| Ekachai Chaibadan || Lumpinee Stadium || Bangkok, Thailand || Decision || 5 || 3:00

|-  style="background:#fbb;"
| 1997- || Loss||align=left| Ekachai Chaibadan || Lumpinee Stadium || Bangkok, Thailand || Decision || 5 || 3:00
|-
! style=background:white colspan=9 |

|- style="background:#fbb;"
| 1997-01-31 || Loss||align=left| Apidej Naratrikun || Lumpinee Stadium || Bangkok, Thailand ||Decision || 5 || 3:00

|- style="background:#fbb;"
| 1996-1997 || Loss ||align=left| Thongchai Tor. Silachai || Lumpinee Stadium || Bangkok, Thailand || KO (punches) ||3 || 2:33

|- style="background:#cfc;"
| 1996-|| Win ||align=left| Khunpinit Kiatawan || Lumpinee Stadium || Bangkok, Thailand || Decision || 5 || 3:00

|- style="background:#cfc;"
| 1996- || Win||align=left| Sakadpetch Kiatpramook || Lumpinee Stadium || Bangkok, Thailand ||Decision || 5 || 3:00

|- style="background:#cfc;"
| 1996-|| Win ||align=left| Srisatchanalai Sasipraphagym || Lumpinee Stadium || Bangkok, Thailand || Decision || 5 || 3:00
|-
|- style="background:#fbb;"
| 1996- || Loss ||align=left| Namsaknoi Yudthagarngamtorn || Lumpinee Stadium || Bangkok, Thailand || Decision || 5 
|| 3:00
|-
|- style="background:#cfc;"
| 1995-12-08 || Win ||align=left| Hurricane Sor.Ploenchit|| Lumpinee Stadium || Bangkok, Thailand || Decision || 5 || 3:00

|- style="background:#cfc;"
| 1995- || Win ||align=left| Pajonsuk Lukprabat||  || Bang Yai district, Thailand || Decision || 5 || 3:00

|- style="background:#cfc;"
| 1995- || Win ||align=left| Pali Sitthiantong||  || Bang Yai district, Thailand || Decision || 5 || 3:00

|- style="background:#cfc;"
| 1995- || Win ||align=left| Payaklek Sor Charoensuk||  || Bang Yai district, Thailand || Decision || 5 || 3:00

|- style="background:#cfc;"
| 1994-1995 || Win ||align=left| Amornoi Sitphuangtong||  || Khon Kaen province, Thailand || Decision || 5 || 3:00

|- style="background:#cfc;"
| 1994-1995 || Win ||align=left| Saifon Odsankha||  || Kalasin province, Thailand || Decision || 5 || 3:00

|- style="background:#cfc;"
| 1988 || Win ||align=left|  ||  || Thailand ||  ||  ||
|-
! style=background:white colspan=9 |
|-
| colspan=9 | Legend''':

Professional boxing record

Name
In Muay Thai, professional boxers rarely perform under their birth name: After entering a training camp, they adopt the name of the camp as their last name, while (usually but not necessarily) keeping their first name. Throughout the career, they may change a training camp or a sponsor, changing their last name correspondingly. Saenchai used following 4 names as a professional fighter.
Saenchai Sor Kamsing / Saenchai Sor.Kamsing
Sangpetch Patanakan Gym
Saenchai Sor Kingstar / Saenchai Sor.Kingstar
Saenchai Sor Saenchai / Saenchai Sor.Saen

References

1980 births
Living people
Flyweight kickboxers
Bantamweight kickboxers
Featherweight kickboxers
Lightweight kickboxers
Thai male Muay Thai practitioners
People from Maha Sarakham province
Thai male boxers